Lieut.-Col. H.H. Mir Sir Imam Bakhsh Khan Talpur G.C.I.E. (December 1860 - 8 February 1921), was 5th ruler of Sohrabani Talpur dynasty of Khairpur State from 1909 until 1921.

Biography 
He was born in December 1860 to Mir Faiz Muhammad Khan Talpur I. He succeeded to the Gaddi on the death of his father on 5 March 1909. During his reign, remarkable progress was seen in the field of education. There were more than 98 schools where education was free. Schools in Khairpur State provided students with meals and living expenses. Both educational institutions and boarding facilities were provided free of charge. He died on 8 February 1921, and was succeeded by his son, Ali Nawaz.

Honours 
He was honored with G.C.I.E. in 1911. He was given honorary rank of Lieutenant Colonel on 1 January 1918 in recognition of valuable services rendered by him in connection with the War. He was also Donat of the Order of St. John of Jerusalem.

References 

1860 births
1921 deaths
Talpur dynasty
Nawabs of Pakistan
Princely rulers of Pakistan